Piriyadha Varam Vendum is an Indian Tamil language soap opera that aired on Zee Tamil. The show premiered on 3 October 2016 on Monday to Friday at 8:00AM 9IST) to 12:00PM (IST) in 10 Episodes. Vijay TV suddenly had stopped the serials in two weeks.

Seethaiyin Raman Starting from Monday on 19 December 2016 on Monday to Friday at 6:00pM IST on Vijay Super.

International broadcast
The Series was released on 3 October 2016 on STAR Vijay. The Show was also broadcast internationally on Channel's international distribution. It aired in Sri Lanka, Singapore, Vietnam, Japan, Canada, Hong Kong, United States, Europe, Malaysia, Mauritius and South Africa on STAR Vijay. Its episodes on their app hotstar.

Dubbed Serial

References

External links
Official website
Andal Azhagar on Facebook

Star Vijay original programming
Tamil-language romance television series
2016 Tamil-language television series debuts
Tamil-language television shows
2016 Tamil-language television series endings